Barry Harris Plays Tadd Dameron is an album by pianist Barry Harris featuring compositions associated with Tadd Dameron. It was recorded in 1975 and released on the Xanadu label.

Reception

Allmusic reviewer Scott Yanow stated: "The perfect player to interpret Tadd Dameron's music (of which he had full understanding), Harris performs eight of the influential composer's songs on this 1975 album".

Track listing 
All compositions by Tadd Dameron, except where indicated.
 "Hot House" - 4:29   
 "Soultrane" - 5:38   
 "The Chase" - 4:58   
 "Lady Bird" - 5:03   
 "Casbah" - 8:27   
 "If You Could See Me Now" (Tadd Dameron, Carl Sigman) - 5:28   
 "The Tadd Walk" - 3:35   
 "Our Delight" - 4:15

Personnel 
Barry Harris - piano
Gene Taylor - bass
Leroy Williams - drums

References 

Barry Harris albums
1975 albums
Xanadu Records albums
Albums produced by Don Schlitten